is a former Japanese football player.

Club career
Nakatani was born in Uji on September 22, 1978. After graduating from high school, he joined Nagoya Grampus Eight in 1997. In 1998, he became a regular player as left side back instead Seiichi Ogawa who got hurt. He moved to Urawa Reds (1999) and Kawasaki Frontale (2000) on loan. However both clubs were relegated to J2 League. He returned to Grampus in 2001 and played until 2005. He played many matches as left midfielder and left side-back. He moved to Kashiwa Reysol. However he could hardly play in the match and he moved to his local club Kyoto Sanga FC in J2 League in September 2007. The club was promoted to J1 League from 2008 and he played many matches. In 2010, he could hardly play in the match and he moved to J2 club Tokyo Verdy in 2011. In 2013, he moved to Thailand and played for Khonkaen. He retired end of 2013 season.

National team career
In August 1995, Nakatani was selected Japan U-17 national team for 1995 U-17 World Championship. He played all 3 matches as substitutes.

Club statistics

References

External links

1978 births
Living people
Association football people from Kyoto Prefecture
Japanese footballers
Japan youth international footballers
J1 League players
J2 League players
Nagoya Grampus players
Urawa Red Diamonds players
Kawasaki Frontale players
Kashiwa Reysol players
Kyoto Sanga FC players
Tokyo Verdy players
Expatriate footballers in Thailand
Footballers at the 1998 Asian Games
Association football midfielders
Asian Games competitors for Japan